1 The Avenue is a building in Spinningfields, Manchester. It is situated on Deansgate adjacent to the grade-I listed John Rylands Library.

Architecture
The building consists of two mirror-image parallelograms, stacked one on top of the other, resulting in a three-storey  cantilever on the east end of the building. The cantilever is supported by an inclined steel ‘diagrid’ structure.

A diagrid is similar in shape to a triangle and other building have used a diagrid structure, such as 30 St Mary Axe in London.

Reaction to the glass clad building has been mixed due its proximity to the Grade I listed Rylands Library which, along with the Town Hall is considered the finest piece of architecture in Manchester and one of the finest interpretations of Gothic revival in the world.

References

External links
1 The Avenue at Spinningfields

Buildings and structures in Manchester
Office buildings in Manchester